Spring Creek is a stream in eastern Howell, north central Oregon and southwestern Shannon counties in the Ozarks of southern Missouri. It is a tributary of the Eleven Point River.

Spring Creek was so named on account of the many springs which flow into it.

See also
List of rivers of Missouri

References

Rivers of Howell County, Missouri
Rivers of Oregon County, Missouri
Rivers of Shannon County, Missouri
Rivers of Missouri